The Citizen is a South African daily newspaper published in Johannesburg, South Africa. The newspaper is distributed nationally in South Africa. It has long been considered a newspaper of record in South Africa. While its core readership is mainly in Gauteng, it also distributes to surrounding provinces such as Free State, Northern Cape, Mpumalanga, Limpopo and the North West. The newspaper is owned by Caxton and CTP Publishers and Printers Limited, a public company listed on the JSE.

History and ownership
The newspaper was founded in 1976 during the apartheid era by Louis Luyt, at which time it was the only major English-language newspaper favourable to the ruling National Party. In 1978, during the Muldergate Scandal, it was revealed that the money to establish and finance the newspaper had come from a secret slush fund of the Department of Information, and ultimately from the Department of Defence.

In 1998, ownership of the newspaper was transferred from Perskor to Caxton and CTP Publishers and Printers Limited,. The company is involved in various fields of publishing and printing such as newspapers, magazines, commercial print, book printing, stationery, packaging and labels.

Format
The Citizen is a compact newspaper. 
In 2012, the newspaper layout and design was revamped Dr. Mario Garcia. On 1 August 2013 the first edition of the revamped newspaper went on sale.

Editors (past and present)
Tim du Plessis

Kevin Keogh

Martin Williams

On 7 October 2013, The Citizen announced[5] that Editor Martin Williams would be stepping down. Williams, who had been with The Citizen for 19 years, retired at the end of October 2013.

Steven Motale

Martin Williams was succeeded by Steve Motale, who at the time was the executive editor of Pretoria News. Motale had started off as a reporter at The Citizen in 2002, later becoming political editor and then editor of Citizen Metro.

Trevor Stevens

Trevor Stevens, who joined The Citizen in 2001 as a sports reporter, became editor of The Citizen in 2017. He is also the current Saturday Citizen editor – a position he has held since 2010.

Online Editors (past and present)
Charles Cilliers (May 2016 - June 2020)

Hendri Pelser (Acting online editor: June 2020 - June 2021)

Earl Coetzee 

Earl took over from Hendri Pelser as acting online editor in July 2021 and was appointed online editor in October 2021.

Regular columnists
Ben Trovato

Isaac Mashaba

William Saunderson-Meyer

Carine Hartman

Jennie Ridyard

Sydney Majoko

Brian Sokutu

Eric Naki

Cliff Buchler

Danie Toerien

Martin Williams

Dirk Lotriet

Kekeletso Nakeli-Dhliwayo

Muzi Yeni

Bruce Fordyce

Wesley Botton

Jonty Mark

Ken Borland

Jonathan Mokuena

Titles/Products
The Citizen

Saturday Citizen (Previously Super Saturday Citizen)

The Citizen Online website

The redesigned website, citizen.co.za, went live on 1 August 2013.

Paywall and digital subscriptions

Supplements
Personal Finance (Mondays) – supplement to help you manage your money 
City (Monday-Saturday) – lifestyle and entertainment supplement
Racing Express (Monday-Saturday) – horse racing supplement
Phakaaathi (Tuesdays) – local and international soccer supplement
Motoring (Wednesdays) – motoring and local motorsport supplement
Gaming (Thursdays) – gaming supplement
Buy in Bulk (Thursdays) – weekly wholesale supplement
Hammer & Gavel (Fridays) – auctions supplement
Travel (Saturdays) – travel supplement
Your Home (last Saturday of the month) – home renovations and DIY supplement

Distribution areas

Circulation figures

Readership figures

See also
 List of newspapers in South Africa

References

External links
 Official website

Daily newspapers published in South Africa
English-language newspapers published in Africa
Organisations associated with apartheid
Mass media in Johannesburg
Online newspapers published in South Africa